Swords Pavilions is a shopping centre, located in Swords, in Fingal, Dublin, Ireland. The centre contains more than 90 shops, restaurants and cafes, as well as the 11 screen Movies@Swords cinema, and has over 2,000 surface and multi-storey parking spaces. The centre is owned by Hammerson and Great-west Lifeco.

Tenants and services
The centre is home to stores such as Primark, Dunnes Stores, H&M, Zara, River Island, SuperValu, Easons, Boots, Rituals and TK Maxx. There is a range of car parks, a cinema and a post office, and there are several restaurants and cafes such as Five Guys, Subway, Abrakebabra, Chopped, Starbucks, Butlers Chocolate Café, Costa and Milano.

History

In 1996, a planning application was sent to Fingal County Council for a commercial complex to be built on a 20-acre site between the Main Street and the Swords by-pass road. Construction work was meant to start in the middle of 1997 with an opening in the autumn of 1998, however construction did not begin until 1999. The Pavilions was eventually opened on the 15 May 2001, by then Taoiseach Bertie Ahern.

Expansion
In 2006, the Movies@Swords cinema was opened. Also in 2006, Phase 2 of the centre was opened, which added retailers such as Penneys. There are plans for a Phase 3, which would be located at the front of the centre. It would be located next to the Swords metro stop on the R132, however Phase 3 has been shelved until further notice.

In June 2018, plans for a €3.3 million development were announced which would reconfigure the first floor of Phase 2 to accommodate 3 new restaurant units where two of the units would be occupied by Five Guys and Milano. The development would also include a glass bridge that will link the first floor of the centre.

References

External links
  

Swords, Dublin
Shopping centres in County Dublin
Shopping malls established in 2001
Buildings and structures in Fingal
21st-century architecture in the Republic of Ireland